Phunchog Rai (born 1944) is an Indian politician from Himachal Pradesh, and a member of the Indian National Congress Party.

Personal life and education 
He hails from village Lari in the Spiti valley. He matriculated from the Government High School in Manali in 1965, and did graduation from Punjab University at Chandigarh.

Political career 
Rai served as an elected representative in the Himachal Pradesh Legislative Assembly from the Lahaul and Spiti assembly constituency from 1990 to 1998. In 1990, he was elected as an MLA, during the second tenure of Shanta Kumar as the Chief Minister of Himachal Pradesh (1990-1992). Rai was re-elected to the Legislative Assembly in 1993, this time under the second tenure of Virbhadra Singh as Chief Minister of Himachal Pradesh (1993-1998). In this period, he served as a cabinet minister. As minister, Rai held two portfolios, those of Tribal Affairs and Health and Family Planning.

In the 11th Legislative Assembly Elections of Himachal Pradesh held in 2007, Rai lost against Dr. Ram Lal Markanda for the Lahaul and Spiti seat.

Other works 

 Rai has been on the Expert Advisory Committee for the development of Buddhist/Tibetan culture and art in the Ministry of Culture, Government of India. 
 In 1996, Rai was present as a minister at the 1,000th anniversary of the Tabo monastery in Spiti, whereat the 14th Dalai Lama also delivered Kalachakra teachings and initiations. 
 Rai wrote the foreword to the book Tribal Melodies of Himachal Pradesh by Manorama Sharma (1998).
 The 'Presidential Address' Rai delivered at a seminar on petroglyphs in the Spiti valley has been published in the book Rediscovering Spiti: a Historical and Archaeological Study (2017).

References

Living people
People from Lahaul and Spiti district
Indian National Congress politicians
Himachal Pradesh MLAs 1990–1992
Himachal Pradesh MLAs 1993–1998
1944 births

Indian National Congress politicians from Himachal Pradesh
Panjab University alumni